The  was a narrow-gauge light railway line in Okinawa Prefecture before the Battle of Okinawa. One of the four lines of Okinawa Prefectural Railways on Okinawa Island, it ran  from Naha Station to Yonabaru Station.

Route
As published by the Ministry of Railways, as of 1 October 1937 the stations on the line between Naha Station and Yonabaru Station were as follows:

See also
 2 ft 6 in gauge railways in Japan
 Rail transport in Okinawa

References

Rail transport in Okinawa Prefecture
History of rail transport in Japan
Naha
Nanjō, Okinawa
Haebaru, Okinawa
Yonabaru, Okinawa